Athenry was a constituency represented in the Irish House of Commons until its abolition on 1 January 1801.

History
Athenry was represented as early as 1378.

In the first Parliament of Elizabeth, Athenry was represented by Thomas Cusack, former Lord Chancellor of Ireland, and John Hooker, an Englishman. Hooker wrote the Irish additions to the 1587 update of Holinshed's Chronicles, in which he describes his own participation in a debate on a bill for the impost of wines.

In the Patriot Parliament of 1689 summoned by King James II, Athenry was represented with two members.

Members of Parliament
1559 Sir Thomas Cusack and John Hooker
1585 William Browne and Nicholas Lynch
1613–1615 Stephen Browne and Ludovic Bodkin
1634–1635 David Burke and Richard Martyn
1639–1649 Geoffrey Browne and John Blake alias Caddell
1661 Henry Whaley and Sir Henry Waddington

1689–1801

Notes

References

Bibliography

Constituencies of the Parliament of Ireland (pre-1801)
Historic constituencies in County Galway
1800 disestablishments in Ireland
Constituencies disestablished in 1800